Illuka Parish was an Estonian municipality located in Ida-Viru County. It had a population of 1013 and an area of 517 km².

Villages
Agusalu, Edivere, Illuka, Jaama, Kaatermu, Kaidma, Kamarna, Karoli, Kuremäe, Kivinõmme, Konsu, Kuningaküla, Kurtna, Ohakvere, Ongassaare, Permisküla, Puhatu, Rausvere, Vasavere.

History
Illuka Parish was formed on 13 February 1992.

In 2017, as part of Administrative reform in Estonia, Alajõe Parish, Iisaku Parish, Illuka Parish, Mäetaguse Parish and Tudulinna Parish were merged into a new administrative unit - Alutaguse Parish. Illuka Municipal Council did not do so willingly and disputed the forced merger in Supreme Court of Estonia, but lost the case.

Mayor of the municipality of Illuka Parish was Oleg Kuznetsov.

International relations

Twin towns — Sister cities
 Duszniki, Poland 
 Taivalkoski, Finland

Gallery

References

External links
 

Former municipalities of Estonia